Ain Beida Airport , also known as Ouargla Airport, is an airport serving Ouargla, a city in the Ouargla Province of eastern Algeria. The airport is in the Sahara Desert, about 540 km southeast of Algiers.

The Ourgla (OUR) VOR-DME and Ourgla (OU) Non-directional beacon navigational aids are north of and aligned with the runways.

Airlines and destinations

World War II
During World War II the airport was known as Sedrata Airfield, and was used by the United States Twelfth Air Force in the Western Desert Campaign in 1942–1943.   Known units assigned to the airfield were:
 17th Bombardment Group, 10 May-23 Jun 1943, B-17 Flying Fortress
 319th Bombardment Group, 1-26 Jun 1943, B-26 Marauder

References

External links 
 
 

Airports in Algeria
World War II airfields in Algeria
Airfields of the United States Army Air Forces in Algeria
Buildings and structures in Ouargla Province